Belvoir Park Hospital was a cancer treatment specialist hospital situated in Newtownbreda, South Belfast, Northern Ireland. Belvoir Park held Northern Ireland's only radiotherapy unit, until the opening of a new cancer treatment centre in Belfast City Hospital.

History
The hospital, which was designed by Young and McKenzie, opened as the Purdysburn Fever Hospital in 1906. The facility became known as Montgomery House in 1953 and it then became Belvoir Park Hospital in the 1960s.

The hospital became the main regional centre for oncology, offering radiotherapy and chemotherapy treatments and in 1983, the hospital was the first in the province to take delivery of a CT scanner. Friends of Montgomery House, a charity founded by Dr Gerard Lynch to help cancer sufferers and their families, was established in 1984 and the hospital's Gerard Lynch Centre held many cancer support groups, in order to aid both sufferers and their families.

After services had been transferred to Belfast City Hospital, the hospital closed in March 2006. In June 2014 the site was sold to a private developer known as the Neptune Group. Neptune Group have since restored some of the original buildings to function as modern townhouses, and the first showhomes were opened in June 2017.

See also
Cancer treatment
Belfast City Hospital

References

Hospital buildings completed in 1906
Defunct hospitals in Northern Ireland
Hospitals established in 1906
1906 establishments in Ireland
2006 disestablishments in Northern Ireland
Hospitals disestablished in 2006
Hospitals in County Down
20th-century architecture in Northern Ireland